Charles Pierre Péguy (7 January 1873 – 5 September 1914) was a French poet, essayist, and editor. His two main philosophies were socialism and nationalism. By 1908 at the latest, after years of uneasy agnosticism, he had become a believing but non-practicing Roman Catholic.
From that time, Catholicism strongly influenced his works.

Biography
Péguy was born into poverty in Orléans. His mother Cécile, widowed when he was an infant, mended chairs for a living. His father Désiré Péguy was a cabinet maker, who died in 1874 as a result of combat wounds. Péguy studied at the Lycée Lakanal in Sceaux, winning a scholarship at the École normale supérieure (Paris), where he attended notably the lectures of Henri Bergson and Romain Rolland, whom he befriended. He formally left without graduating, in 1897, though he continued attending some lectures in 1898. Influenced by Lucien Herr, librarian of the École Normale Supérieure, he became an ardent Dreyfusard.

In 1897, Péguy married Charlotte-Françoise Baudoin; they had one daughter and three sons, one of whom was born after Péguy's death. Around 1910 he fell deeply in love with Blanche Raphael, a young Jewish friend; however, he was faithful to his wife.

From his earliest years, he was influenced by socialism. He joined the Socialist Party in 1895. From 1900 until his death in 1914, he was the main contributor to and the editor of the literary magazine Les Cahiers de la Quinzaine, which at first supported the Socialist Party director Jean Jaurès. However, Péguy ultimately ended this support after he began viewing Jaurès as a traitor to the nation and to socialism. In the Cahiers, Péguy published not only his own essays and poetry, but also works by important contemporary authors such as Romain Rolland.

His free-verse poem, "Portico of the Mystery of the Second Virtue", has gone through more than 60 editions in France. It was a favorite book of Charles de Gaulle.

When the First World War broke out, Péguy became a lieutenant in the 19th company of the French 276th Infantry Regiment. He died in battle, shot in the forehead, near Villeroy, Seine-et-Marne on the day before the beginning of the Battle of the Marne. There is a memorial to Péguy near the field where he was killed.

Influence

During the Second World War both supporters and opponents of Vichy France cited Péguy. Edmond Michelet was the first of many members of the French Resistance to quote Péguy; de Gaulle, familiar with Péguy's writing, quoted him a 1942 speech. Those who opposed Vichy's anti-Semitism laws often cited him. By contrast, Robert Brasillach praised Péguy as a "French National Socialist", and Péguy's sons Pierre and Marcel wrote that their father was an inspiration for Vichy's National Revolution ideology and "above all, a racist". It has been written that Péguy would likely have been horrified by his future influence on fascism.

The English novelist Graham Greene alluded to Péguy in Brighton Rock, while The Heart of the Matter has as its epigraph a quotation from Péguy. In The Lawless Roads Greene refers to Péguy "challenging God in the cause of the damned".

The Swiss theologian Hans Urs von Balthasar, in the course of describing the history of art as an ongoing, sometimes more and sometimes less successful approximation of God's creativeness, noted that Péguy's Eve was a "theological redemption of the project of Proust", meaning that where Proust was gifted with memory and charity, the Eve of Péguy – not necessarily Péguy himself – was gifted with memory, charity, and direct knowledge of the redemption of God.

English poet Geoffrey Hill published a book-length poem in 1983 in homage to Péguy, entitled The Mystery of the Charity of Charles Péguy.

Famous quotations
"The world has changed more in the last 30 years [since 1909] than in all the time since Jesus Christ."
 
"The sinner is at the very heart of Christianity. Nobody is so competent as the sinner in matters of Christianity. Nobody, except the saint." This is the epigraph to Graham Greene's novel The Heart of the Matter (1948).

"It will never be known what acts of cowardice have been committed for fear of not looking sufficiently progressive." (Notre Patrie, 1905)

"Tyranny is always better organised than freedom".

"Kantian ethics has clean hands but, in a manner of speaking, actually no hands."

"How maddening, says God, it will be when there are no longer any Frenchmen."

"There will be things that I do that no one will be left to understand." (Le Mystère des saints Innocents)

"It is impossible to write ancient history because we do not have enough sources, and impossible to write modern history because we have too many". (Clio, 1909)

"Everything begins in mysticism and ends in politics." (Notre Jeunesse, 1909)

"Homer is original this morning, and nothing is perhaps so old as today's newspaper."

Works
Essays 
 (1901). De la Raison.
 (1902). De Jean Coste.
 (1905). Notre Patrie.
 (1907–08). Situations.
 (1910). Notre Jeunesse.
 (1910). Victor-Marie, Comte Hugo.
 (1911). Un Nouveau Théologien.
 (1913). L'Argent.
 (1913). L'Argent Suite.
 (1914). Note sur M. Bergson et la Philosophie Bergsonienne.
 (1914). Note Conjointe sur M. Descartes et la Philosophie Cartésienne (posth.)
 (1931). Clio. Dialogue de l'Histoire et de l'âme Païenne (posth.)
 (1972). Véronique. Dialogue de l'Histoire et de l'âme Charnelle. Paris: Gallimard (posth.)

Poetry
 (1912). Le Porche du Mystère de la Deuxième Vertu.
 (1913). La Tapisserie de Sainte Geneviève et de Jeanne d'Arc.
 (1913). La Tapisserie de Notre-Dame.
 (1913). Ève.

Plays
 (1897). Jeanne d'Arc. Paris: Librairie de la Revue Socialiste.
 (1910). Le Mystère de la Charité de Jeanne d'Arc.
 (1912). Le Mystère des Saints Innocents.

Miscellany
 (1927). Lettres et Entretiens (posth.) 
 (1980). , 1905–1914: Charles Péguy – Pierre Marcel. Paris: Minard (posth.)

Collected Works
 (1916–55). Œuvres Complètes de Charles-Péguy. Paris: Gallimard (20 vols.) 
 (1941). Œuvres Poétiques Complètes. Bibliothèque de la Pléiade: Gallimard.
 (1987–92). Œuvres en Prose Complètes:
 Tome I. Bibliothèque de la Pléiade: Gallimard, 1987.
 Tome II. Bibliothèque de la Pléiade: Gallimard, 1988.
 Tome III. Bibliothèque de la Pléiade: Gallimard, 1992.

Works in English translation
 (1943). "Freedom," Commonweal, 8 January, p. 293.
 (1943). Basic Verities. Prose and Poetry, Trans. by Ann and Julien Green. New York: Pantheon Books Inc. 
 (1944). Man and Saints. Prose and Poetry, Trans. by Ann and Julien Green. New York: Pantheon Books Inc.
 (1950). The Mystery of the Charity of Joan of Arc, Trans. by Julien Green. New York: Pantheon Books Inc. [London: Hollis & Carter, 1950; Carcanet, 1986].
 (1956). The Mystery of the Holy Innocents, Trans. by Pansy Pakenham. London: The Harvill Press [New York: Harper, 1956].
 (1999). "The Mystery of the Holy Innocents," Communio 26 (2).
 (1958). Temporal and Eternal, Tran. by Alexander Dru. London: The Harvill Press [New York: Harper, 1958; Liberty Fund, 2001].
 (1964). A Vision of Prayer. Mount Saint Bernard Abbey: Saint Bernard Press.
 (1965). God Speaks. New York: Pantheon Books Inc.
 (1970). The Portico of the Mystery of the Second Virtue, Trans. by Dorothy Brown Aspinwall. Metuchen, N.J.: Scarecrow Press.
 (1994). "On the Mystery of Hope," Communio 21 (3).
 (1996). The Portal of the Mystery of Hope, Trans. by David Louis Schindler Jr. Edinburgh: T. & T. Clark [Wm. B. Eerdmans Publishing Co., 2003; Continuum, 2005].
 (2009). "On Money," Communio 36 (3).

Notes

References
Adereth, Maxwell (1967). Commitment in Modern French Literature: A Brief Study of 'Littérature Engagée' in the Works of Péguy, Aragon, and Sartre. London: Victor Gollancz.
Halévy, Daniel (1918). Charles Péguy et les Cahiers de la Quinzaine. Paris: Payot et Cie.
Jussem-Wilson, Nelly (1965). Charles Péguy. London: Barnes and Barnes.
Jorge Juan Molinas Lara (2014). Crisis and commitment: Political ethics on Charles Péguy. The University of Valencia.
Moran, Sean Farrell (1989). "Patrick Pearse and the European Revolt Against Reason", The Journal of the History of Ideas,50, 4, 423–66
Mounier, Emmanuel (1931). La Pensée de Charles Péguy. Paris: Plon.
O'Donnell, Donat (1951). "The Temple of Memory: Péguy," The Hudson Review, Vol. 3, No. 4, pp. 548–574.
Rolland, Romain (1944). Péguy. Paris: A. Michel.
Schmitt, Hans A. (1967). Charles Péguy: The Decline of an Idealist. Louisiana State University Press.
Secrétain, Roger (1941). Péguy, Soldat de la Liberté. Montréal: Valiquette.
Servais, Yvonne (1950). "Charles Peguy and the Sorbonne: 1873–1914," Studies: An Irish Quarterly Review, Vol. 39, No. 154, pp. 159–170.
Servais, Yvonne (1953). Charles Péguy: The Pursuit of Salvation. Cork University Press.
Turquet-Milnes, G. (1921). "Charles Péguy," in Some Modern French Writers. A Study in Bergsonism. New York: Robert M. McBride & Company, pp. 212–241.
Villiers, Marjorie (1965). Charles Péguy: A Study in Integrity. Londres: Collins.

External links

 
 
 
 
 Charles Péguy biography by James Horrox at The Literary Encyclopedia

1873 births
1914 deaths
Writers from Orléans
French Roman Catholics
French socialists
Catholic socialists
Chartres
Christian humanists
Christian poets
Converts to Roman Catholicism from atheism or agnosticism
École Normale Supérieure alumni
French Christian socialists
20th-century French journalists
French male poets
French philosophers
20th-century French poets
French male essayists
Catholic philosophers
Roman Catholic writers
Lycée Lakanal alumni
French World War I poets
French military personnel killed in World War I
French Roman Catholic writers
French Army officers